is a Japanese shōjo romance manga series by Akira Wao. It has been published by Shogakukan in Ciao from 2009 to 2012. An original video animation was recorded in the Ciao appendix DVD from February 2011 to May 2012.

Plot
 (voiced by Azumi Asakura) is a quiet girl who goes to the all-female Chō Shibuya High School. A stunningly boy named Tochiotome transfers into her class, and he transforms Himeko into a princess as well.

Media

Manga
Hime Gal Paradise ran in the manga magazine Ciao since November 27, 2009 and ended on November 30, 2012. There are seven volumes in total.

References

External links
Official website 

Shogakukan manga
Shōjo manga
Gyaru in fiction